The Holy Alliance (Svyashchennyy soyuz; also called the Grand Alliance) was a coalition linking the monarchist great powers of Austria, Prussia, and Russia. It was created after the final defeat of Napoleon at the behest of Emperor (Tsar) Alexander I of Russia and signed in Paris on 26 September 1815. The alliance aimed to restrain liberalism and secularism in Europe in the wake of the devastating French Revolutionary Wars and the Napoleonic Wars, and it nominally succeeded in this until the Crimean War. Otto von Bismarck managed to reunite the Holy Alliance following the unification of Germany in 1871, but the alliance again faltered by the 1880s over Austrian and Russian conflicts of interest over the dissolution of the Ottoman Empire.

Establishment
Ostensibly, the alliance was formed to instil the divine right of kings and Christian values in European political life, as pursued by Alexander I under the influence of his spiritual adviser Baroness Barbara von Krüdener. It was written by the Tsar and edited by Ioannis Kapodistrias and Alexandru Sturdza. Under the treaty European rulers would agree to govern as "branches" of the Christian community and offer mutual service. In the first draft Tsar Alexander I made appeals to mysticism through a proposed unified Christian empire that was seen as disconcerting by the other monarchies. Following revision, a more pragmatic version of the alliance was adopted by Russia, Prussia, and Austria. The document was called "an apocalypse of diplomacy" by French diplomat Dominique-Georges-Frédéric Dufour de Pradt. 

The agreement was at first secret, and mistrusted by liberals though liberalism was effectively restrained in this political culture until the Revolutions of 1848. 

About three months after the Final Act of the Congress of Vienna, the monarchs of Catholic (Austria), Protestant (Prussia), and Orthodox (Russia) confession promised to act on the basis of "justice, love, and peace", both in internal and foreign affairs, for "consolidating human institutions and remedying their imperfections".

The Alliance was quickly rejected by the United Kingdom (though George IV declared consent in his capacity as King of Hanover), the Papal States, and the Ottoman Empire. Lord Castlereagh, the British Foreign Secretary, called it "a piece of sublime mysticism and nonsense". Nonetheless, Britain participated in the Concert of Europe.

Organization
In practice, the Austrian state chancellor and foreign minister, Prince Klemens von Metternich made it a bastion against democracy, revolution, and secularism. It also allowed coordinating suppression of Polish efforts to restore an independent state, by Austria in the Kingdom of Galicia and Lodkmeria, by Russia in its Congress Poland and by Prussia in the Grand Duchy of Posen and in West Prussia. The monarchs in the Alliance used it to suppress revolutionary influence (especially from the French Revolution) from entering their own nations. 

The Alliance is usually associated with the later Quadruple and Quintuple Alliances, which included the United Kingdom and (from 1818) France with the aim of upholding the European peace settlement and balance of power in the Concert of Europe concluded at the Congress of Vienna. On 29 September 1818, Alexander, Emperor Francis I of Austria and King Frederick William III of Prussia met with the Duke of Wellington, Viscount Castlereagh and the Duc de Richelieu at the Congress of Aix-la-Chapelle to demand stern measures against university "demagogues", which would be realized in the Carlsbad Decrees of the following year. At the Congress of Troppau in 1820 and the succeeding Congress of Laibach in 1821, Metternich tried to align his allies in the suppression of the Carbonari revolt against King Ferdinand I of the Two Sicilies. The Quintuple Alliance met for the last time at the Congress of Verona in 1822 to advise against the Greek Revolution and to resolve upon the French invasion of Spain.

The last meetings had revealed the rising antagonism between Britain and France, especially on Italian unification, the right to self-determination, and the Eastern Question. The Alliance is conventionally taken to have become defunct with Alexander's death in 1825. France ultimately went her separate way following the July Revolution of 1830, leaving the core of Austria, Prussia, and Russia as a Central-Eastern European block which once again congregated to suppress the Revolutions of 1848. The Austro-Russian alliance finally broke up in the Crimean War. Though Russia had helped to suppress the Hungarian Revolution of 1848, Austria did not take any action to support her ally, declared herself neutral, and even occupied the Wallachian and Moldavian lands on the Danube upon the Russian retreat in 1854. Thereafter, Austria remained isolated, which added to the loss of her leading role in the German states, culminating in her defeat during the Austro-Prussian War in 1866.

See also
Biedermeier
Second League of Armed Neutrality
 Quintuple Alliance
1834 Quadruple Alliance
Unholy alliance (geopolitical)
Vormärz

References

Further reading
 Fischer-Galati, Stephen A. "The Nature and Immediate Origins of the Treaty of Holy Alliance." History 38.132 (1953): 27-39. online

 Knapton, E.J.  "The Origins of the Treaty of Holy Alliance." History 26.102 (1941): 132-140. online
 
The Holy Alliance Treaty text

Late modern Europe
19th-century military alliances
1815 in international relations
Military alliances involving Austria
Military alliances involving Prussia
Military alliances involving Russia
Austrian Empire
19th century in Prussia
19th century in the Russian Empire
19th century in Germany
Treaties of the Austrian Empire
Treaties of the Kingdom of Prussia
Treaties of the Russian Empire